Lloyd is an unincorporated community in Blaine County, Montana, United States. Its ZIP code is 59535. It is located near the Bears Paw Mountains.

Named for an early prospector, “Old Man Lloyd”, the town achieved permanency when William Wilson established a post office and store in 1890.

Notes

Unincorporated communities in Blaine County, Montana
Unincorporated communities in Montana